The Chongnyon Hotel (Youth Hotel) is a hotel located in the Mangyongdae District of Pyongyang, the capital city of North Korea. It was opened on 1 May 1989 and is situated on the junction of Chongchun Street and Kwangbok (Liberation) Street. 

The hotel has 30 floors, with 900 rooms, and has a karaoke room and an outdoor swimming pool.

See also
 
List of hotels in North Korea
Tourism in North Korea

References

External links
Chongnyon Hotel at Naenara

Hotels in Pyongyang
Hotel buildings completed in 1989
Hotels established in 1989
1989 establishments in North Korea
20th-century architecture in North Korea